PRR may refer to:

 Parietal reach region, of the human brain
 Pattern recognition receptor, receptors of the innate immune system that identify pathogen-associated molecular patterns
 Pennsylvania Railroad (reporting mark), an American railroad
 Personal Role Radio, a radio carried by UK troops
 Populist radical right, a loose collection of political ideologies
 Porsche Rennsport Reunion, an automotive event
 Princes Risborough railway station (National Rail station code), England
 Production Rule Representation, a proposed computing standard
 Proportional reporting ratio, a statistic used in data mining for health surveillance systems
 Pseudo-response regulator, a group of genes that are important in the circadian oscillator of plants
 Pure Reason Revolution, a British rock group formed in 2003

See also
 PRRS (disambiguation)